The 1986 Tour de Romandie was the 40th edition of the Tour de Romandie cycle race and was held from 5 May to 11 May 1986. The race started in Lugano and finished in Geneva. The race was won by Claude Criquielion of the Hitachi team.

General classification

References

1986
Tour de Romandie
1986 Super Prestige Pernod International